Bażyny  is a village in the administrative district of Gmina Orneta, within Lidzbark County, Warmian-Masurian Voivodeship, in northern Poland.

Before 1772 the area was part of Kingdom of Poland, 1772-1945 Prussia and Germany (East Prussia).

References

Villages in Lidzbark County